Histone acetyltransferase KAT7 is an enzyme that in humans is encoded by the KAT7 gene. It specifically acetylates H4 histones at the lysine12 residue (H4K12) and is necessary for origin licensing and DNA replication. KAT7 associates with origins of replication during G1 phase of the cell cycle through complexing with CDT1. Geminin is thought to inhibit the acetyltransferase activity of KAT7 when KAT7 and CDT1 are complexed together.

Interactions 

KAT7 has been shown to interact with:
 AR,
 CDT1,
 MCM2
 ORC1L and
 VIM,

References

Further reading